The men's 4 x 100 m surface relay event in finswimming at the 2001 World Games took place on 25 August 2001 at the Akita Prefectural Pool in Akita, Japan.

Competition format
A total of 7 teams entered the competition. Only final was held.

Results

References

External links
 Results on IWGA website

Finswimming at the 2001 World Games